The loach minnow (Rhinichthys cobitis) is a species of freshwater fish. It is a member of the carp family (family Cyprinidae) of order Cypriniformes. It occurs in streams and small rivers throughout the Gila River and San Pedro River systems in Arizona, New Mexico, and Sonora; it is now considered extinct in Mexico.

Description

Loach minnow has an elongated, compressed body with its size rarely exceeding  in length. This species have an olivaceous body, highly blotched with darker pigment. They have dirty-white spots before and behind base of dorsal fin, and on lower and upper sides base of caudal. Breeding males have vivid red-orange markings on bases of fins, body, and lower head. Breeding females become yellow on their fin and lower body.
The loach minnow has whitish spots that are present on the origin and insertion of the dorsal fin as well as on the dorsal and ventral portions of the caudal fin base, this distinguishes the loach minnow from the similar speckled dace for field identification.

Biology

Loach minnow are short-lived fishes, depending on their environment and different characteristics of individual population. Spawning is observed to take place from late winter in early summer. Their eggs are deposited on the bottom of flattened rocks, and the number of eggs can range from 5 to more than 250 per rock, with average of 52-63 eggs per rock. A female can contain have from 150 – 1200 mature ova. Males turn red on their fins an above their mouths when they are ready to breed.

Habitat and Food

Loach minnow can be found at turbulent, rocky riffles of mainstream rivers. They prefer moderate to swift current velocity and gravel substrates. This species are opportunistic benthic insectivores, they seek food at the bottom substrate for riffle-dwelling larval ephemeropterans, simuliid, and chironomid dipterans.

Conservation

Loach minnow was proposed (USDI, Fish and Wildlife Service [USFWS] 1985) and subsequently listed (USFWS 1986) as a threatened species. Critical habitat was proposed (USFWS 1985) and signed into effect on March 8, 1994. It is commonly viewed as endangered by those who work with the fish, and many believe that an endangered listing would be warranted.

References

Rhinichthys
Freshwater fish of Mexico
Freshwater fish of the United States
Fish of the Western United States
Extinct animals of Mexico
Fauna of the Sonoran Desert
Endemic fauna of Arizona
Endemic fauna of New Mexico
Natural history of Sonora
Gila River
Endangered fish
Taxa named by Charles Frédéric Girard
Fish described in 1856
ESA endangered species
Species endangered by habitat fragmentation
Species endangered by damming
Species endangered by invasive species